Look Ahead America is a conservative political advocacy group and nonprofit formed by former Trump campaign staffer Matt Braynard in August 2017. The group's stated goals are to identify working-class and rural voters, to increase voter registration and mobilization, local community activism, and to advocate for increased transparency in the voting process such as forensic investigations of fraudulent vote claims and equipping poll watchers with cameras.

Since 2021, Look Ahead America has organized public rallies and other activities defending the rights of prisoners and arrestees at the 2021 capital attack.

History 
Look Ahead America applied for tax exemption on May 19, 2017, with a posting date of August 16 of the same year, giving the organization a 501(c)3 tax-exempt status.

The organization's tax exemption was revoked on May 15, 2020, with the revocation posted on August 11, 2020.

In November 2020, Matt Braynard launched the Voter Integrity Fund, later renamed the Voter Integrity Project. When crowdfunding website GiveSendGo was hacked, it was revealed that the Voter Integrity Project raised nearly $700,000 in donations on the site, surpassing a goal of $500,000. The leftover funds from this venture were rolled into Look Ahead America, which officially relaunched on January 20, 2021. With the rolled over funds, Look Ahead America had a total of $793,000 in donations for 2021. The organization reapplied for tax exempt status, which was retroactively approved as of December 10, 2021.

"J6" Activities 

Look Ahead America held a series of rallies titled "Justice for J6" in support of the individuals who were arrested and charged for the January 6th riot at the US Capitol. Prior to the first rally, Look Ahead America had sent a letter to the Department of Justice and Federal Bureau of Investigation on 29 January 2021. The letter requested that these departments drop all charges against non-violent offenders, citing their lack of mens rea for the justification of charges.

Braynard paired with Cara Castronuova of Citizens Against Political Persecution (CAPP), and—on behalf of both organizations—filed a formal complaint with the United Nations Human Rights Committee regarding the prisoners. Braynard and Castronuova also worked together to hold rallies in Washington, D.C. and in 17 states between 19 June 2021 and 2 October 2021.

"Justice for J6" Rallies 
Three rallies were held in the District of Columbia (DC): the first on was on June 19 outside the Department of Justice, the second on July 17 outside the DC Corrections facility, and the third on September 18 on the grounds of the U.S. Capitol. No member of congress attended—although candidates Mike Collins, who ran in Georgia's 10th congressional district, and Joe Kent, who ran in Washington's 3rd congressional district—did attend.

Lawmakers and law enforcement officials expressed concerns over possible unrest at the September 18 rally.

Delegate to the US House of Representatives Eleanor Holmes Norton, and member of the Democratic Party, said that the fence used for the security preparations for the inauguration of Joe Biden "should not be used to preemptively block people from protesting on Capitol grounds, no matter their views," as the rally was covered under the First Amendment.

Despite concerns, the event occurred without incident and remained peaceful. Four people were arrested both before and after the rally itself, although D.C. police stated that these arrests were unrelated.

Look Ahead America had also held satellite rallies in nine states prior to the September 18 rally, including July 14 in Arizona. The event included speakers U.S. Representative Paul Gosar and State Representative Mark Finchem. The other eight rallies were held on 17 July 2021 in Florida, Iowa, New Jersey, New York, South Carolina, Texas, Wyoming and Georgia.

Candlelight vigils 
On the 1-year anniversary of the January 6 incident, Look Ahead America organized 35 candlelight vigils taking place across 12 States and Washington, D.C. Among these locations were:

 Nogales, Phoenix, Prescott, Yuma, and Queen Creek Arizona
 St. Augustine, Clearwater, Fort Lauderdale, Largo, Lakeland, Milton, and Vero Beach Florida
 Jefferson and Woodstock Georgia
 Columbus, North Carolina
 Aiken, South Carolina
 Washington, D.C.

Ashli Babbitt's mother, Micki Witthoeft, was present at the vigil in Washington, D.C. No individuals were arrested or injured at this event. However, a counter protestor was arrested at the Clearwater, Florida rally after being found with a homemade explosive device near the site. The man was later released and all felony charges against him were dropped, although he was sentenced to six months probation and a $450 fine for loitering or prowling charges.

J6 Question Project 
On 24 February 2022, Look Ahead America announced the launch of the J6 Question project, in which voters were encouraged to submit video recordings of themselves asking State and federal candidates in the 2022 United States elections what their policy would be regarding the suspects charged in connection with the January 6 incident. Congressional figures such as US Representative Miller-Meeks were interviewed. as well as 2022 Oregon gubernatorial candidates.

J6 Prisoner Database 
On August 12, 2021 Look Ahead America launched the J6 Prisoner Database. The database can be downloaded from their website, and searched or sorted by multiple fields including name, case number, case status, and other fields.

On January 6, 2023, the second anniversary of the January 6th incident, Look Ahead America director Matt Braynard issued a statement concerning the prisoners. In his statement, he said, "Despite two years passing, of the nearly 1000 arrested so far, only 349 have had their cases resolved. There are forty-four serving in prison, including nine individuals who were not convicted of any violent acts." He also indicated that Look Ahead America plans to continue efforts to support the prisoners.

The Political Prisoner Podcast 
As of October 21, 2021 the group launched a podcast titled The Political Prisoner. Guests have included the mother of Ashli Babbitt Micki Whitthoeft, CAPP founder Cara Castronuova, prisoner Jake Lang, Oath Keepers member Jeremy Brown, and others.

Jobs For #J6 
On 3 October 2022, Look Ahead America launched a project to connect January 6 participants and their families with businesses who are willing to hire them. It is an effort to assist the participants re-enter the workforce after arrest or incarceration and to provide their families with work opportunities as well.

Dominion Voting Systems lawsuits 

On March 18, 2021, Look Ahead America sued the Stark County Board of Elections for violating Ohio's Open Meetings Act when they considered purchasing Dominion Voting Systems equipment. The suit was filed in the Court of Common Pleas in Stark County on behalf of Look Ahead America and Stark County Resident Merry Lynne Rini of Massillon.

On 1 June 2021, the Ohio Supreme Court ruled that the Stark County Board of Commissioners must buy the voting machines selected by the Stark County Board of Elections, citing R.C. 3506.03.

On 20 August 2021, the commissioners and Dominion were dropped as defendants, with only the Stark County Board of Elections remaining. Dominion will operate in Stark County for the time being.

On 20 October 2022, Stark County Common Pleas Judge Taryn Heath dismissed the case. The decision is pending appeal.

2021 CPAC Sponsors

Florida 2021 
Look Ahead America was present at the February 2021 Conservative Political Action Conference (CPAC) held in Orlando, Florida, where United States House of Representatives Congresswoman Marjorie Taylor Greene was their guest speaker.

Look Ahead America had an exhibit featuring a "Surfer Trump" statue loaned by artist Tommy Zegan that went viral. Zegan, a Trump supporter who had recently immigrated to Mexico, created the statue with a "magic wand" in his left hand, referring to the quote by then-president Barack Obama in which he posed, in reference to Trump's promise to increase manufacturing jobs in the United States, "Well, what, how exactly are you going to negotiate that? What magic wand do you have?"

Texas 2021   
Look Ahead America had both United States House of Representatives Congressmen Matt Gaetz and Allen West as guest speakers at the July 2021 CPAC in Dallas, Texas. The group held an unofficial panel taking place on the third day of the conference in a different room of the hotel.

Activism

Look Ahead Arizona 
On April 26, 2021, Look Ahead America launched Look Ahead Arizona, a voter registration and community organizing effort. It received a $2 million United States Dollar grant from Jim Lamon for funding.

Look Ahead Arizona also held a series of Town hall meetings featuring former AZ Secretary of State Ken Bennett. The meetings were focused on the results of the 2021 Maricopa County presidential ballot audit.

New Jersey 
After extensive meetings between Look Ahead America's local volunteers and New Jersey State Senator Joe Pennachio, the senator introduced bill S-4162, which would require all elections in the state to use open source voting equipment.

Georgia 
On November 1, 2021, Look Ahead America's "Faith Outreach Coordinator" Brandon Sims proposed one day of Sunday voting to Cherokee County election officials. In turn, they passed a bipartisan motion opting for a trial run on Sunday, October 23, 2022, with a follow-up cost/benefit analysis.

On January 4, 2022, Sims discussed a similar proposal with Hall County, Georgia election officials, resulting in two days of Sunday voting from 2 May through 20 May 2022, with an additional two dates on October 22 and 23 for the Georgia General Election. The same proposal was discussed and approved in Forsyth County, which held its first day of Sunday Voting on May 15, 2022, for the General Primary and Nonpartisan General Election.

On February 8, 2022, Look Ahead America officially launched its get-out-the-vote effort "Patriotic Souls to the Polls," as a follow-up on prior activities. The initiative was launched in order to give rural churches the same opportunity to organize Souls to the Polls available to urban churches in municipalities such as Fulton County and DeKalb County, with the goal of increasing equitable voting access to citizens irrespective of socioeconomic status, party affiliation, or geographic location.

In March 2022, Sims presented the Sunday voting proposal to Bartow County officials but the motion did not pass.

Wisconsin 
On May 31, 2022, the Wisconsin Election Commission (WEC) sent a letter to its municipal clerks stating that "clerks may have received communications from out-of-state groups Look Ahead America and the Voter Integrity Project" regarding errors in the municipalities' voter rolls. The areas addressed included indefinitely confined voters, voters who moved out of state or municipality, and voters registered at nonresidential areas. Although the WEC cautioned against inaccuracies, incomplete evidence, bias, and hearsay when dealing with allegations of improper registration, the commission acknowledged that Look Ahead America could potentially provide help in identifying errors in the voter rolls.

On July 14, 2022, Look Ahead America representatives claimed that "some district attorneys are reviewing cases with others pending litigation. Other non-resident registrations the organization uncovered were forwarded to the Fraud Unit of the Wisconsin Department of Motor Vehicles."

In October 2022, the WEC rejected 9 of 11 complaints filed by Wisconsin citizens on behalf of Look Ahead America (LAA). The WEC rejection letters included warnings of potential $500 fines for filing frivolous claims. The Look Ahead America Research Director, Ian Camacho, objected to allegations that the complaints were "frivolous" and affirmed that all filed complaints included ample primary source documentation to substantiate the claims. Despite the WEC responses, in some cases, municipal election clerks acted on the complaints after completing their own investigations.

Pre-election Voter List Audit 
On October 5, 2022 Look Ahead America launched a project to identify voters who are candidates for removal from voter rolls so that challenges could be made to those registrations. The reasons cited for the project were illegitimate addresses or voters having moved permanently out of state. Nine states were included in this program: Ohio, Arizona, Florida, Georgia, North Carolina, Nevada, Pennsylvania, Virginia, and Wisconsin. Although it was reported that no challenges were received in Ohio, the Montgomery County, Ohio Board of Elections reported receiving 15 challenges although only 2 are being considered for a possible hearing. Challenges have also been made in Nevada and Georgia by citizens of those states.

Pennsylvania 
On December 6, 2022, citizens in the Lycoming County Patriots organization sued Lycoming County officials regarding the county results of the 2020 election and are requesting a forensic audit. They cited that Look Ahead America had provided 11 potential fraudulent registrations to director of elections Forrest K. Lehman, who is alleged to have admitted that six of these in fact were. As of December 27, 2022, the county is seeking to dismiss the suit.

References

External links 

Conservative political advocacy groups in the United States
Political organizations established in 2017